Events in the year 1971 in Portugal.

Incumbents
President: Américo Tomás 
Prime Minister: Marcelo Caetano

Arts and entertainment
Portugal participated in the Eurovision Song Contest 1971, with Tonicha and the song "Menina do alto da serra".

Sport
In association football, for the first-tier league seasons, see 1970–71 Primeira Divisão and 1971–72 Primeira Divisão; for the Taça de Portugal seasons, see 1970–71 Taça de Portugal and 1971–72 Taça de Portugal. 
 27 June - Taça de Portugal Final
 Establishment of the Portuguese Handball Cup

Births
 21 July - Nuno Markl, comedian and radio host
 September 25 – Valter Hugo Mãe, writer

References

 
Portugal
Years of the 20th century in Portugal
Portugal